Paul Ferris (born 10 July 1965) is a Northern Irish former footballer, physiotherapist for Newcastle United, barrister and author.

Biography
Ferris was born in Lisburn, Northern Ireland. In 1981, he signed for Newcastle United from Lisburn Youth in Northern Ireland and became the club's youngest ever debutant when he appeared aged just 16 years and 294 days. He scored his only senior goal against Bradford City in 1984. A medial ligament injury meant he played just 14 matches and moved to Barrow F.C., whom he led to win the FA Trophy at Wembley before moving into local non-league football with Gateshead.

In 1993, he returned as physio under Kevin Keegan. He remained there until 2006, during which time he gained a master's degree in History of Ideas. He also studied law before leaving to pursue a career as a barrister and was called to the bar at the Middle Temple in 2007. He returned to the club in April 2009 as part of Alan Shearer's management team.

He wrote his first novel An Irish Heartbeat in 2011. He formed a health and fitness company (Speedflex) with Graham Wylie and Alan Shearer, with Ferris as Chief Executive.

He suffered a heart attack in 2013. He wrote his memoir The Boy On The Shed, which went on to be a highly acclaimed, multi-award-winning bestselling book (British Sports Book Awards - Autobiography of the Year / Sunday Times Sports Book of the Year / Times Sports Book of the Year  / Daily Telegraph Football Book of the Year / Shortlisted for William Hill Sports Book of the Year). He was diagnosed with prostate cancer in 2016 and recovered following treatment.

He lives in Northumberland, England, with his wife Geraldine and has three boys and a granddaughter. He continues to write and has given several well received talks on his life story to date.

References

External links
Paul Ferris at Post War English & Scottish Football League A – Z Player's Database

1965 births
Living people
Sportspeople from Lisburn
Association footballers from Northern Ireland
Association football midfielders
English Football League players
Newcastle United F.C. players
Gateshead F.C. players
Association football physiotherapists
Newcastle United F.C. non-playing staff
Barristers from Northern Ireland
Writers from Northern Ireland